George Needham may refer to:
Sir George Needham (businessman) (1843–1928), English businessman and prominent citizen of Oldham
George Needham (footballer) (1894–1967), English footballer
George Needham (teacher) (1804–1894), Classics teacher in colonial South Australia